"Blue Remembered Hills" is the 14th episode of ninth season of the British BBC anthology TV series Play for Today. The episode was a television play that was originally broadcast on 30 January 1979. "Blue Remembered Hills" was written by Dennis Potter, directed by Brian Gibson and produced by Kenith Trodd.

The play concerns a group of seven-year-olds playing in the Forest of Dean one summer afternoon in 1943. It ends abruptly when the character Donald is burned to death, partly as a result of the other children's actions. Perhaps the most striking feature of the play is that, although the characters are children, they are played by adult actors. Potter first used this device in Stand Up, Nigel Barton (1965) and returned to it in Cold Lazarus (1996).

The dialogue is written in a Forest of Dean dialect, which Potter also uses extensively in other dramas incorporating a Forest of Dean setting, most notably A Beast with Two Backs (1968), Pennies from Heaven (1978) and The Singing Detective (1986).

Cast
The stars of the original production were:

Robin Ellis (John), Michael Elphick (Peter), Colin Welland (Willie), John Bird (Raymond), Helen Mirren (Angela), Janine Duvitski (Audrey), Colin Jeavons (Donald).

The screenplay has also been adapted for the theatre. The play is now a standard text for GCSE Drama in Great Britain.

Title
The title comes from the 40th poem in A.E. Housman's A Shropshire Lad. The poem is read by Potter himself at the end of the BBC version of the play.

References

External links
 
 British Film Institute - Screen Online
 Blue Remembered Hills 2012 UK Tour
 TV Cream Review
 Review of Blue Remembered Hills Production in Strode Theatre, Street, Somerset, U.K..com
 Blue Remembered Hills at Brighton Open Air Theatre, July 2017

1979 British television episodes
1979 television plays
Period pieces
Play for Today